Tecnophilus is a genus of beetles in the family Carabidae, containing the following species:

Tecnophilus croceicollis (Menetries, 1843)
Tecnophilus pilatei Chaudoir, 1877

References

Lebiinae